The 2018–19 Green Bay Phoenix men's basketball team represented the University of Wisconsin–Green Bay in the 2018–19 NCAA Division I men's basketball season. The Phoenix, led by fourth-year head coach Linc Darner, played their home games at the Resch Center, with five home games at the Kress Events Center, as members of the Horizon League. They finished the season 21–17, 10–8 in Horizon League play to finish in a tie for fourth place. They defeated UIC in the quarterfinals of the Horizon League tournament before losing in the semifinals to Wright State. They were invited to the CollegeInsider.com Tournament where they defeated East Tennessee State, FIU, Cal State Bakersfield, and Texas Southern to advance to the championship game where they lost to Marshall.

Previous season
The Phoenix finished the 2017–18 season 13–20, 7–11 in to finish in seventh place. They defeated Detroit in the first round of the Horizon League tournament before losing in the quarterfinals to eventual Horizon League Tournament champion Wright State.

Roster

Schedule and results

|-
!colspan=9 style=|  Exhibition

|-
!colspan=9 style=|  Non-conference regular season

|-
!colspan=9 style=|  Horizon League regular season

|-
!colspan=9 style=|Horizon League tournament
|-

|-
!colspan=12 style=|CollegeInsider.com Postseason tournament
|-

References

Green Bay Phoenix
Green Bay Phoenix men's basketball seasons
Green Bay Phoenix men's b
Green Bay Phoenix men's b
Green Bay